Caswell County Courthouse is a historic county courthouse located in Yanceyville, Caswell County, North Carolina.  It was built between 1858 and 1861, and is a rectangular two-story, stuccoed brick building, five bays wide and seven deep.  It sits on an elevated granite block foundation and features a two-level recessed entrance porch and octagonal cupola.

State Senator John W. Stephens was assassinated by the Ku Klux Klan in the courthouse on May 21, 1870.

It was added to the National Register of Historic Places in 1973. It is located in the Yanceyville Historic District.

References

External links

Historic American Buildings Survey in North Carolina
County courthouses in North Carolina
Courthouses on the National Register of Historic Places in North Carolina
Government buildings completed in 1861
Buildings and structures in Caswell County, North Carolina
National Register of Historic Places in Caswell County, North Carolina
1861 establishments in North Carolina